In the time Big Brother ran from 2000 to 2018, there were a total of 327 civilian, 10 Panto, 8 teen, 12 Celebrity Hijack and 14 ultimate housemates; 151 men and 170 women. There have been 19 winners of Big Brother; 11 men and 8 women. The first male winner was Craig Phillips in Big Brother 1 and the first female winner was Kate Lawler in Big Brother 3. The youngest winner is Cameron Cole, who was 19 at the time of winning Big Brother 19, and the oldest winner is Jason Burrill, who was 45 when he won Big Brother 17.

A total of 177 housemates have been evicted, 15 have been ejected, one left due to injury and 23 have walked from the Big Brother house. Only one housemate, Nikki Grahame, has been voted back into the house after being evicted. Nick Bateman and Victor Ebuwa are the only people to have been housemates in three series; Big Brother, Big Brother Panto and Ultimate Big Brother. Goody had also appeared in three different series and is, to date, the only civilian housemate to have been a housemate in Celebrity Big Brother, as well as appearing in Big Brother and Big Brother Panto. Furthermore, Grahame appeared in four series of the show in total; Big Brother 7, Ultimate Big Brother, Big Brother 16 and Big Brother Canada 4. In 2010, Big Brother 2 winner Brian Dowling was crowned Ultimate Champion over the first 11 series of Big Brother on Channel 4. More contestants are set to compete when the programme is revived on ITV2 in September 2023.

Housemates
Key
 Winner
 Runner-up
 Third place
 Walked
 Ejected
 Housemate has died since participating

Notes
  Ages at the time the housemate entered the house
  Occupation at the time the housemate entered the house

Statistics
 Number of housemates: 304
 Male housemates: 151
 Female housemates: 170
 Two competing as one housemate: 3*
 Male winners: 11 (Latest: Cameron Cole – Big Brother 19)
 Female winners: 8 (Latest: Isabelle Warburton – Big Brother 18)
 Walks: 24 (Latest: Kay Lovelle – Big Brother 19)
 Ejections: 15 (Latest: Lewis Flanagan – Big Brother 19)
 First to enter: Sada Walkington (Big Brother 1)
 Last to enter: Hussain Ahmed (Big Brother 19)
 Last out: Cameron Cole (Winner) (Big Brother 19)
 Biggest winning percentage: 77.5% to win – Josie Gibson (Big Brother 11)
 Closest winning percentage: 50.6% to win – Helen Wood (Big Brother 15)
 Biggest eviction percentage: 94.04% to evict – Nicole Cammack (Big Brother 9)
 Closest eviction percentage: 50.5% to evict – Science Harvey (Big Brother 6)
 Most total nominations: 46 nominations – Marcus Akin (Big Brother 10)
 Most nominations in a single week: 10 nominations – Sunshine Martyn (Big Brother 11), Dexter Koh (Big Brother 14), Jayne Connery (Big Brother 17)
 Most times nominated: 8 times – Marcus Akin, Freddie Fisher/Halfwit (Big Brother 10)
 Most total nominations for a winner: 25 nominations – Aaron Allard-Morgan (Big Brother 12)
 Fewest total nominations for a winner: 3 nominations** – Pete Bennett (Big Brother 7), Brian Belo (Big Brother 8), Chloe Wilburn (Big Brother 16)
 Most total nominations from a finalist: 34 nominations – Dexter Koh (Big Brother 14)
 Fewest total nominations from a finalist: 0 nominations** – Kinga Karolczak (Big Brother 6), Amanda and Sam Marchant (Big Brother 8)
 Most time spent in the house: 100 Days – Nikki Grahame (Big Brother 7, Ultimate Big Brother, Big Brother 16)
 Least time spent in the house: 1 Day – Ellis Hillon (Big Brother 19)

* Sam and Amanda Marchant (Big Brother 8) are not included in this as they began the series as two separate housemates, but Emma and Victoria (Big Brother 17) are included as they started as one Housemate, despite Victoria voluntarily leaving on Day 5 and Emma remaining as a sole Housemate.
** Helen Wood (Big Brother 15) received 0 nominations but received a pass to the final in Week 1 meaning she was exempt from nominations every week.

Specials
Key
 Winner
 Runner-up
 Third place
 Walked
 Ejected

International versions

See also
 List of Celebrity Big Brother (British TV series) housemates

References

Big Brother (British TV series)